Bhaora Union is a union of Mirzapur Upazila, Tangail District, Bangladesh. It is situated  3 km north of Mirzapur and 26 km southeast of Tangail, The district headquarter.

Demographics
According to Population Census 2011 performed by Bangladesh Bureau of Statistics, The total population of Bhaora union is 17872. There are  4123 households in total.

Education
The literacy rate of Bhaora Union is 61.5% (Male-65.6%, Female-57.9%).

See also
 Union Councils of Tangail District

References

Populated places in Dhaka Division
Populated places in Tangail District
Unions of Mirzapur Upazila